Iselemagazi was the capital of Mirambo from which he ruled over his domain of Urambo. In 1879 it had a population of about 15,000 people.

Today it is part of the Shinyanga region of Tanzania.

Sources
Dictionary of African Biography p. 224

Populated places in Tanzania